Parliamentary elections were held in Portugal on 9 July 1871.

Results

References

1871
1871 elections in Europe
1871 in Portugal
July 1871 events